Olaf Berg Kindt (19 August 1850 – 3 September 1935) was a Norwegian physician.

He was born in Trondhjem as a son of chief physician Christian Sommer Kindt (1816–1903) and Johanne Sofie Berg (1826–1907). In 1878 he married Henriette Augusta Trampe (1854–1929), daughter of a lieutenant colonel.

He finished his secondary education in 1869 and graduated from the Royal Frederick University with the cand.med. degree in 1877. He settled in Trondhjem as a physician in 1885, serving as city physician from 1890 to 1919. He also worked for Trøndernes Arbeidersamfund until 1925, and Ths. Angells stiftelser from 1899.

He was a board member of the Norwegian Medical Association, and from 1924 an honorary member of Trondhjem Medical Association. He was also a fellow of the Royal Norwegian Society of Sciences and Letters. He was also a member of Trondhjems Theater Interessentskab. He died in September 1935 and was buried at Lade.

References

1850 births
1935 deaths
People from Trondheim
University of Oslo alumni
Norwegian municipal physicians
Royal Norwegian Society of Sciences and Letters